Golden Hill is a mountain located in the Catskill Mountains of New York south of Kingston. Fly Mountain is located south-southwest, and Pink Hill is located southwest of Golden Hill.

References

Mountains of Ulster County, New York
Mountains of New York (state)